Saint-Amable is a town  east of Montreal in southwestern Quebec, Canada, within the Marguerite-D'Youville Regional County Municipality. The population as of the 2016 Canadian Census was 12,167.

History
The city, founded on 21 June 1921, is named after Amable de Riom, a popular saint from the period of New France (1534-1763).

Demographics 

Economy
Within the fertile area between the Saint Lawrence and Richelieu rivers, Saint-Amable has agriculture as its main economic activity.

See also
List of cities in Quebec

References

External links
 Municipality of St. Amable

Cities and towns in Quebec
Greater Montreal
Incorporated places in Marguerite-D'Youville Regional County Municipality